The 2012 Barcelona Ladies Open was a women's tennis tournament played on outdoor clay courts. It was the 6th edition of the Barcelona Ladies Open, and an International-level tournament on the 2012 WTA Tour. It took place at the Centre Municipal Tennis Vall d'Hebron in Barcelona, Catalonia, Spain between April 9 and 15, 2012. Sara Errani won the singles title.

Singles main draw entrants

Seeds

 Rankings are as of April 2, 2012

Other entrants 
The following players received wildcards into the main draw:
 Garbiñe Muguruza Blanco
 Arantxa Parra Santonja
 Flavia Pennetta
 Francesca Schiavone

The following players received entry from the qualifying draw:
 Yuliya Beygelzimer
 Annalisa Bona
 Aravane Rezaï
 Laura Thorpe

The following player received entry as a lucky loser:
 Estrella Cabeza Candela

Withdrawals
  Elena Baltacha (right foot injury) 
  María José Martínez Sánchez (right thigh injury)

Retirements
  Polona Hercog (dizziness)

Doubles main draw entrants

Seeds

1 Rankings are as of April 2, 2012

Other entrants
The following pairs received wildcards into the doubles main draw:
  Estrella Cabeza Candela /  Inés Ferrer Suárez
  Silvia Soler Espinosa /  Carla Suárez Navarro

Champions

Singles

 Sara Errani defeated  Dominika Cibulková 6–2, 6–2
It was Errani's 2nd title of the year and 4th of her career.

Doubles

 Sara Errani /  Roberta Vinci defeated  Flavia Pennetta /  Francesca Schiavone, 6–0, 6–2

External links 
 

  
Barcelona
Barcelona Ladies Open
Barcelona